Fiorenzo Tomea (1910 in Zoppè di Cadore, Belluno – 1960 in Milan) was an Italian painter.

Biography
Tomea studied at the Cignaroli Academy in Verona, where he met Giacomo Manzù and Renato Birolli, in the period 1926–27. Having moved to Milan, he came into contact with Edoardo Persico, who invited him to exhibit his work at the Galleria del Milione in 1931. His focus was primarily on landscape and still life. The second half of the 1930s saw the first marks of official recognition, including a gold medal at the 1st Mostra del Sindacato Interprovinciale Fascista di Belle Arti di Milano in 1937. He joined the Corrente group and presented work with them at the Milan Società per le Belle Arti ed Esposizione Permanente in 1939. The Venice Biennale devoted a room exclusively to Tomea’s work at the 23rd Esposizione Internazionale d’Arte della Città di Venezia in 1942. His painting concentrated on landscapes of the Cadore area in the post-war years. He was the runner-up for the Marzotto Prize in 1954 and won the Michetti Prize at Francavilla del Mare in 1958.

References
 Antonella Crippa, Fiorenzo Tomea, online catalogue Artgate by Fondazione Cariplo, 2010, CC BY-SA (source for the first revision of this article).

Other projects

20th-century Italian painters
Italian male painters
1910 births
1960 deaths
20th-century Italian male artists